The Lory Meagher Cup (often referred to as the Meagher Cup) is the fifth-highest inter-county senior championship  in hurling. Each year, the champion team in the Lory Meagher Cup is promoted to the Nicky Rackard Cup.

The Lory Meagher Cup, which was introduced for the 2009 season, provides a meaningful championship for fifth tier teams deemed "too weak" for the fourth tier Nicky Rackard Cup.

The winners of the championship receive the Lory Meagher Cup, named after former Kilkenny hurler Lory Meagher who many regard as one of the greatest hurlers of all time.

History

Following the success of the Christy Ring Cup and Nicky Rackard Cup for the lower tier hurling teams, it was decided in 2008 to investigate the possibility of introducing a fourth tier. The Hurling Development Committee (HDC) proposed the new four-tier structure in place of the existing three-tier model. It, and the second and third-tier competitions, were to consist of eight teams. The proposals were accepted at a special GAA Congress in October 2008.

2023 Teams

Winners listed by year

Roll of Honour

General Statistics

 Legend

  – Champions
  – Runners-up
  – Semi-Finals/Quarter-Finals/Round 2
  – Group Stage
 CR – Christy Ring Cup
 NR – Nicky Rackard Cup
 -  – Inactive

For each tournament, the number of teams in each finals tournament (in brackets) are shown.

The most one sided Finals:
 15 points - 2021: Fermanagh 3-26 - 1-17 Cavan
 13 points - 2022: Louth 3-27 - 3-14 Longford
 12 points - 2013: Warwickshire 2-16 - 0-10 Longford
 11 points - 2020: Louth 2-19 - 2-08 Fermanagh
 8 points - 2010: Longford 1-20 - 1-12 Donegal

Debut of teams

References

 
All-Ireland inter-county hurling championships
Hurling cup competitions